Girolamo Brusaferro was an Italian painter of the 18th century, active in his native Venice. He was a pupil of Niccolo Bambini and Sebastiano Ricci. He has paintings in various churches in Venice including the Carmini. He collaborated by painting figures in the landscapes and backgrounds of Marini Antonio of Padua.

Sources

17th-century Italian painters
Italian male painters
Painters from Venice
Italian Baroque painters